Bahreman Rural District is a rural district (dehestan) in Nuq District, Rafsanjan County, Kerman Province, Iran. At the 2006 census, its population was 6,956, in 1,731 families. The rural district has 32 villages.

References 

Rural Districts of Kerman Province
Rafsanjan County